Anthony Launce Bucknall (born 7 June 1945) is a former  international rugby union player and captain.

He was capped ten times as a flanker for England between 1969 and 1971 and captained England in one international, against  in January 1971.

He played for Oxford in the 1965 and 1966 Varsity matches and played club rugby for Richmond.

References

1945 births
Living people
English rugby union players
England international rugby union players
Rugby union flankers
Oxford University RFC players
Alumni of the University of Oxford
Richmond F.C. players